Leaving Meaning (stylized as leaving meaning.) is the fifteenth studio album by American experimental band Swans. It was released October 25, 2019 on Young God and Mute. A double album, Leaving Meanings songs have been mixed separately for vinyl and CD releases, with the CD version of the album containing the original (and extended) mixes of the songs, as well as an additional track, "Some New Things". As with all Swans' releases of the 2010s, Leaving Meaning was financed by a fundraiser album – in this case, What Is This? in March 2019.

Critical reception

Upon its release, Leaving Meaning received mostly positive reviews from music critics. At Metacritic, which assigns a normalized rating out of 100 to reviews from mainstream publications, Leaving Meaning received an average score of 75, based on 16 reviews, indicating "generally favorable reviews". Andrew Perry of Mojo gave the album a favorable review, comparing it partly to The Burning World and writing, "Whatever the sonic weather, Gira's spiritual austerity remains unimpaired."

Accolades

Track listing
 CD & digital version 

 Vinyl version 

 Personnel 
Adapted from the official Young God Records website:Swans Michael Gira – vocals, electric and acoustic guitar
 Kristof Hahn – lap steel guitar, electric guitar, acoustic guitar, vocals
 Larry Mullins – drums, Mellotron, percussion, vibes, vocals
 Yoyo Röhm – bass guitar, double bass, keyboards, vocalsPrevious Swans Thor Harris – percussion, trumpet, clarinet, gizmos, vibes and bells
 Christopher Pravdica – bass guitar
 Phil Puleo – hammered dulcimer ("Amnesia")
 Norman Westberg – electric guitar, vocals
 Paul Wallfisch – pianoGuests Chris Abrahams – piano, organ ("The Nub", "Leaving Meaning")
 Tony Buck – drums, percussion ("The Nub", "Leaving Meaning", "Some New Things")
 Lloyd Swanton – double bass ("The Nub", "Leaving Meaning")
 Anna von Hausswolff – choral vocals
 Maria von Hausswolff – choral vocals
Ben Frost – electric guitar, vocals, synth
 Baby Dee – lead vocal ("The Nub")
 Fay Christen – vocals ("The Nub")
 Ida Albertje Michels – vocals ("The Nub")
 Jennifer Gira – vocals
 Jeremy Barnes – santur, hi-hat, fiddlesticks, accordion, engineering
 Heather Trost – violin, viola, fiddlesticks, engineering
 Dana Schechter – bass
 Cassis Staudt – accordion, harmoniumOther contributors'
 Ingo Krauss
 Peter Wright
 Daniel Miller
 Francesco Fabris
 Howard Wuelfing
 John Allen
 Brandon Perry
 Todd Cole
 Paul A. Taylor
 Jason LaFarge

Charts

References

External links
 

2019 albums
Swans (band) albums
Albums produced by Michael Gira
Young God Records albums
Mute Records albums